Guglar (also Romanized as Gūglar; also known as Gūlar) is a village in Chaypareh-ye Bala Rural District, Zanjanrud District, Zanjan County, Zanjan Province, Iran. At the 2006 census, its population was 48, in 9 families.

References 

Populated places in Zanjan County